Joseph W. Garten (born August 13, 1968) is an American former professional football player who was an offensive lineman in the Canadian Football League (CFL) and World League of American Football (WLAF). He played college football for the Colorado Buffaloes, where he was a two-time consensus All-American. He played professionally for the Las Vegas Posse and San Antonio Texans of the CFL, and the Barcelona Dragons and Frankfurt Galaxy of the WLAF.

Professional career
Garten was selected by the Green Bay Packers in the sixth round (164th pick overall) of the 1991 NFL Draft.

References

1968 births
Living people
All-American college football players
American football centers
American football offensive guards
American players of Canadian football
Barcelona Dragons players
Canadian football offensive linemen
Colorado Buffaloes football players
Frankfurt Galaxy players
Green Bay Packers players
Las Vegas Posse players
San Antonio Texans players